Claire Renard (born 10 December 1944) is a French composer and multimedia artist.

Biography
Born in Neuilly-sur-Seine, France, Claire Renard studied piano and law in Paris and graduated from the Conservatoire national supérieur de musique et de danse de Paris in 1973. After completing her studies, she worked as a piano teacher and as a composer of classical and electroacoustic works for sound installations.

She has been composer-in-residence at the Theatre of Saint-Quentin-en-Yvelines (1994–1996), Ville d'Epinal (1998), the National Conservatory of Grenoble (1999), the Theatre Athénor/St. Nazaire (2000), Villa Italy Gamberaia (2001–2002), European meeting Objective1 = Art = Objective1 Austria (2001), Park and Grande Halle de la Villette, Grame/Centre National de Création Musicale/Lyon (2005) and the Sally and Don Lucas Artists Programs Montalvo Art Center, California, USA (2006).

Honours and awards
 Villa Medicis Hors les Murs prize, 1990
 Beaumarchais Foundation Prize for audiovisual works, 1990
 Beaumarchais Foundation Prize for operatic works, 2002
 Fellowship from DICREAM, 2002

Works
Renard composes electro-acoustic works for music performances and sound installations. Her works have been installed and performed in France, Switzerland, Belgium, Italy, Austria, Finland and Greece. Selected works include:

 The Winds Of Time
 The Folds of the Sky
 I Need
 Take Me
 It Never Ceases to Die of this Said
 Summer Shorts
 A Roar of his Laughter
 Octave
 Air Dance
 Valley Closed
 Sand & Uncertainty

References

1944 births
20th-century classical composers
20th-century French composers
20th-century French women musicians
French classical composers
French women classical composers
Living people
20th-century women composers